Jesús Rafael Soto (June 5, 1923 – January 17, 2005) was a Venezuelan op and kinetic artist, a sculptor and a painter.

His works can be found in the collections of the main museums of the world, including Tate (London), Museum Ludwig (Germany), Centre Georges Pompidou (Paris), Galleria Nazionale d’Arte Moderna (Roma) and MoMA (New York). One of the main museums of art in Venezuela, in his home town, has his name in tribute to him.

Early life
Jesús Rafael Soto was born in Ciudad Bolívar in Venezuela.  The eldest of four children born to Emma Soto and Luis Garcia Parra, a violin player.  From a very young age, Soto wanted to help support his family anyway he could, but art was the most interesting to him. He picked up the guitar and also began recreating famous pieces of art that he found in various books, magazines and almanacs.

At 16, Soto started his serious artistic career when he began to create and paint posters for the cinemas in Ciudad Bolivar. "At that age - says the artist -, the only artists that I knew were the lettering painters. My family was very happy. I could earn some money, make lettering till the end of my days. Nobody looked further than that..."

In 1938, Soto participates in a student group affiliated to surrealism ideas and publish in the local journal some poems that scandalize the society. In the group, Soto learns about automatic writing and charcoal drawing.  "I drew heads, portraits, I had a great technique. Finally, there were people that made a petition, the bishop asked to see it and he signed it. I got a scholarship…"

Education 
In 1942 he received a scholarship to study artistic training at the Escuela de Artes Plásticas y Artes Aplicadas (Plastic and Applied Arts School) in Caracas, finishing his studies in 1947. Once there, he took classes in "pure art" and the "training course for instructors in art education history." The director of the school, Antonio Edmundo Monsanto, was instrumental to Soto’s career as well as other very important Venezuelan artist (Omar Carreño, Carlos Cruz-Diez, Narsico Deboug, Dora Hersen, Mateo Manaure, Luis Guevara, Pascual Navarro, Mercedes Pardo and Alejandro Otero) since he often brought inspirations from foreign countries to his students, including the latest from the avant-garde: cubism.

"When I got in the Fine Arts School - says Soto -, the first thing I saw was the reproduction of a dead nature of Braque". This image caused such impact on him because "...the color started to separate off the form" and because of the multiplicity of the viewing points that he wanted to represent. For Soto, this was the starting point.

Influences 
After Soto had graduated from Escuela de Artes Plasticas y Artes Aplicadas, receiving a teaching degree, he was then hired to be the director of the Escuela de Bellas Artes de Maracaibo from 1947 to 1950. When he was teaching there, he received a government grant to travel to France, and settled in Paris.

In France, Soto discovered Paul Klee and Piet Mondrian’s work, and the latter suggested the idea of ‘dynamizing the neoplasticism’. This, joined with Soto's will to create a new sort of movement that would add to three dimensional art concluded in associations with Yaacov Agam, Jean Tinguely, Victor Vasarely, and other artists connected with the Salon des Réalités Nouvelles and the Galerie Denise René.

Career 
In the beginning, Soto painted post-impressionist works, latter getting interested in Cubism. After getting in touch with Malevich, Mondrian and the constructivists, Soto started to experiment with optical phenomena and op art and then he began to make art that was more than just pictures.

The first serial works 
In the 1950s, Soto experimented with serial art: the repetition of formal elements in the plan, the depersonalization of the work and the revelation of the relativity of the vision. He achieved the reproduction of vibratory phenomena and, above all, the rupture of notions like composition and equilibrium. Making the work of art a fragment of an infinite reality, that could be repeated without varying its essential structure. Without a beginning, an end, up, down, right, left. Helped by notions from the mathematics and music fields, Soto makes his serial art.

Incorporation of time and real movement 
The next step on Soto's works was incorporating time and real movement through the treatment of the space. The work should be an autonomous object, where "real" situations were put into play, and not a plan where a determinate vision was projected. At the same time that the spectator was moving in front of the work of art, to obtain from it its optical vibrational effects, time and real movement were being incorporated. In his Dos cuadrados en el espacio (1953), Soto began a series retaking the approaches of Malevich, specially about adopting the square as the "only valid form".

In his Desplazamiento de un cuadro transparente (1953–54) he created a spatial effect on a plane surface that latter was developed in a tridimensional way, superimposing two or more Plexiglas sheets, transparent but painted with straight or curved drawings that changed the way they were seen as the spectator moved, inviting the participation of the public. This work was the response to a discovery: the ambiguity of spatial perception

In 1955 Soto participated in the exhibition Le Mouvement, in the Denise René gallery, in Paris. Other artists being shown were Yaacov Agam, Marcel Duchamp and Victor Vasarely. The exhibition prompted the publication of the ‘Yellow Manifest’ about kinetic art and the visual researches involving spectators and stimulus. The kinetic art movement gained force in Europe and Latin-America after this exhibition.

Dematerialization of form 
As results of the optical vibratory states that Soto achieves from the superposition of plans, a new situation appears: the outbreak of the solid body, its dematerialization in our retina, phenomena that is produced for the first time in Permutación (1956). In Estructuras cinéticas de elementos geométricos (1955-57) and Armonía transformable (1956) is added a new element that was relegated in his research: color. It is about the superposition of different plexiglass planes, where color frames are inscribed, introducing new vibratory elements. The real division of the plane that had previously undergone an unfolding is produced here. Its structure already suggests a true spatial dimension, as a consequence of the equivalence of its obverse and its reverse. The situation becomes more complex, due to the multiplication of different lines, colors and directions. Plexiglass, medium that had provided the possibility of conforming aleatory states, begins to be an impediment and the search for a new way of materializing vibration starts.

The conformation of a new visual order 
To the preoccupation of searching for a new way of materializing the vibratory states is added the concern to approach human scale, integrating Soto's works to architecture. This is how in Estructura Cinética (1957) the frames that had been drawn on plexiglass become real elements: metal rods welded between them. Soto's works become real special objects that visitors are able to penetrate.

In the 1950s and beginning of the 1960s, starting from his basic concept of matter and space as different manifestations of energy, Soto had already structured the conceptual platform of his plastic language. Works like Escritura and Muro de Bruselas, both from 1958, already contain all the elements that will be developed later.

"My work of art - as Soto says -, is totally abstract. It was born from a reflection about painting and the propositions of our biggest (artists). I don't copy nature, I isolate fundamental properties of the reality. For me, works are, before all, signs, no matter. It would be wrong to see in the work that is in front of you the object of my art, it isn't there if not as a witness, sign of another thing..."

Space plenitude 
All of Soto's work, from start to end, answers to the same necessity of materialize his concept of the world as an impossible reality to measure in a human scale; vision where are vital the energy and space as essential situations inside nature. To reveal this situations in all of its complex dimension was the impulse that has fed his plastic research.

"When you enter a penetrable, you have the sensation of being in a light swirl, a total plenitude of vibrations. The Penetrable is a kind of concretization of this plenitude in which I make people move and make them feel the body of space. Is a way of materializing what exist, is an immaterial state, one state that for me isn't irreal, but a reality. Reality exists all over the place and fill all the universe. Emptiness doesn't exist, anywhere. This is my basic line of thought."

Contributions 

'Soto would set the bases for an art that transcended the conventional parameters of painting and sculpture.'  By inviting the spectator to participate in the work, instead of merely looking from a distance, Soto more deeply engages the audience, and makes the experience more intriguing and stimulating. Soto had a partner in this movement. On the other hand, his counterpart Carlos Cruz-Diez focused more on the way colours are perceived by the eye. One of his series called Fisicromias (Physiochromies) shows how coloured light is perceived and displaced through one's eyes. Another artist that participated in this style was Alejandro Otero. His series Colortions (Rhythmicolors) combine the same concepts of the perception of colour in the eye and participators' movement with the work, but gave greater attention to how the colours are controlled with vertical lines.

Jesús Rafael Soto died in 2005 in Paris, and is buried in the Cimetière du Montparnasse.

Impact 

Like many other Venezuelan artists from this time, Jesus Rafael Soto and Carlos Cruz-Diez considered their works a response to what they felt the problems were in art of their time. They wanted to express a more universal process of art. Because of this, their works are contributions that continue to enrich the art world. Their willingness to contribute and put themselves in a more universal approach to art, was a direct rebuttal to the traditional views of art in Latin America. With Venezuela, this was a way for them to add what they felt was missing in the art of Latin America.

Painting, in history was an act of responding to the situation at hand in the mind of Soto and Cruz-Diez. "Everything else was academic, anachronistic, or as Alejandro Otero said, "the work of a man hiding behind time.""

Collections

In 1973, the Jesús Soto Museum of Modern Art opened in Ciudad Bolívar, Venezuela with a collection of his work. Venezuelan architect Carlos Raúl Villanueva designed the building for the museum and Italian op artist Getulio Alviani was called to run it. Something that is different about this gallery is that a large number of the exhibits are wired to the electricity supply so that they can move.

Environmental integrations 

 1957: "Structure cinétique", Ciudad Universitaria, Caracas, Venezuela
 1958: "Wall of Brussels", I.V.I.C., Caracas, Venezuela (made for Universal Exhibition of Brussels, 1958). "Tour de Bruxelles", I.V.I.C., Caracas, Venezuela (made for Universal Exhibition of Brussels, 1958).
 1967: "Volume suspendu", Expo 67, Pavililon of Venezuela, Montreal, Canada (ephemeral environment in the pavilion made by architect Carlos Raúl Villanueva for intégration of Soto's monumental artwork, Universal Exhibition in Montréal, 1967).
 1968-69: ''Ephemeral Environment'' made for the end year festivities, Place Furstenberg, Paris, France.
 1969: "Mur cinétique" (2), UNESCO, Paris, France. "Progresión a centro móvil", Torre Capriles, Caracas, Venezuela. "Paralelas vibrantes", Torre Capriles, Caracas, Venezuela. "Volumen cinético", Torre Capriles, Caracas, Venezuela.
 1970: Hall, Deutsche Bundesbank, Francfort, Germany. "Extension et progression dans l'eau", Rethel college, The Ardennes, France. Hall, Faculté de Médecine et de Pharmacie, Rennes, France.
 1971: "Vibración amarilla", I.V.I.C., Caracas, Venezuela.
 1972: Hall, pharmaceutical Laboratory Sandoz, Basle, Switzerland.
 1972-82: Complejo Cultural Teresa Carreño, Caracas, Venezuela.
 1973: "El gran mural de las escrituras", Banco Central de Venezuela, Caracas, Venezuela. "Extension et progression dans l'eau", Paseo Ciencias, Maracaibo, Venezuela.
 1973-95: "Penetrable", Parque García Sanabría, Santa Cruz de Tenerife, Spain.
 1974: "Mur cinétique", International duOffice for Work, Geneva, Switzerland.
 1975: Hall and restaurant of the personnel, Régie Renault, Boulogne- Billancourt, France. "Progression", CES (college), Moreuil, France.
 1977: "Suspended Virtual Volume", Royal Bank of Canada, Toronto, Canada. "Mural Cavendes", Edificio Cavendes, Caracas, Venezuela.
 1979: "Environnement", Reception, Cars-Motors, Caracas, Venezuela. "Gran escritura negra", Banco de Venezuela, Caracas, Venezuela. "Volumen virtual suspendido", Centro Banaven, Caracas, Venezuela. "Interférences vibrantes", West Deutsche Landesbank, Dortmund, Germany.
 1982: "Progresión suspendida amarilla y blanca", Entidad de Ahorro y Préstamo, Puerto La Cruz, Venezuela.
 1983: "Progresión amarilla", Metro Chacaíto, Caracas, Venezuela. "Cubo virtual azul y negro", Metro Chacaíto, Caracas, Venezuela.
 1984: "Extensión azul y blanca", Seguros La Seguridad, Caracas, Venezuela. "Volumen virtual polícromo", Deutsche Eisenbahn Versicherung, Cologne, Germany.
 1985: "Esfera Japón", Edificio Banco Lara, Caracas, Venezuela.
 1987: "Cubo Meneven", Edificio Corpoven, Puerto La Cruz, Venezuela.
 1988: "Ovoide Polar", Fundación Polar, Caracas, Venezuela. "Cubo Provincial", Banco Provincial, Caracas, Venezuela. "Mur Polychrome", CFDT, Paris, France. "Ecriture", CFDT, Paris, France. "Large Sphere of Seoul", Olympic Park, Seoul, South Korea (made for Olympiade of Arts during Olympic Games in Seoul, 1988). "Media esfera roja", Seguros La Seguridad, Caracas, Venezuela. "Cubo virtual", Torre Banco Provincial, Caracas, Venezuela.
 1992: "Media esfera azul y verde", Seville, Spain (made for Universal Exhibition in Seville, 1992).
 1993: "Dos cubos virtuales", Darier Hentsch & Cie., Geneva, Switzerland.
 1993-94: "Cubo de Francia", Ambassade de France, Caracas, Venezuela.
 1995: "Welcoming Flag", Dowa Fire & Marine Insurance Company Phoenix Tower, Osaka, Japan.
 1989-1995: "Volume virtuel Air France", Air France Head Office, Roissy, France.
 1997: Integration of four artworks, Hall, KPMG, La Défense (Paris), France. "Cube noir Penetrable", Fondazione Il Giardino di Daniel Spoerri, Seggiano (Grosseto), Italy. "Sphère bleue", Samsung Plaza, Gare de Suhyun (Megaport of Bundang), South Korea. "Penetrable of Tongyoung", Tongyoung Nammang Open Air Sculpture Park, Korea (1997). "Virtual Ellipsoids", Dresdner Bank Head Office, Berlin, Germany. "Esfera de Caracas", motorway Francisco Fajardo, Caracas, Venezuela.
 1998-99: "La esfera de Margarita", Porlamar, Margarita Island, Venezuela.
 2001: "Large ovale", new Chinese Petroleum Corporation Head Office, Taipei, Taiwan.

Individual exhibitions

Prizes

Bibliography

 Abadie, Daniel. Entrevista para el catálogo de la Exposición Soto: cuarenta años de creación, Museo de Arte Contemporáneo de Caracas, 1983
 Abadie, Daniel; Gómez, Hannia; Nordmann, Agnés and Pierre, Arnaud. Soto A Gran Escala. Published by MACCSI. 
 Boulton, Alfredo. Jesús Soto. Editorial Armitano, 1973
 Brodsky, Estrellita and Rich, Sarah. Soto: Paris and Beyond, 1950-1970. New York University, 2012. 
 Clay, Jean. Rostros del Arte Moderno. Monte Avila Editores, Caracas, 1971
 Cuevas, Tatiana, Obrist, Hans Ulrich, Santoscoy, Paola. Jesús Rafael Soto. "Visión en Movimiento", 2007. 
 Hernández D’Jesus, Enrique. Entrevista publicada em el suplemento especial del Diario de Caracas, 1993
 Huerta, Ninoska. Soto Classical and Modern. Fundación Corp Group Centro Cultural, Caracas, 2000. 
 Jiménez, Ariel. Texto para el catálogo de la exposición retrospectiva de Jesús Soto. Francia, Abbaye Saint André Centre d’Art Contemporain Meymac. 1992
 Jiménez, Ariel. Texto para el catálogo de la exposición SOTO: Re-pensar lo visible, Museo de Arte Contemporáneo de Maracay Mario Abreu, 1993
 Jiménez, Ariel. Jesús Soto in Conversation with Ariel Jiménez. Fundación Cisneros/Colección Patricia Phelps de Cisneros 
 Joray, Marcel and Sot,o Jesús Rafael. Soto. Éditions du Griffon, Paris, 1984. ASIN: B0018PFZBK
 Lemaire, Gerard-Georges. Soto (Serie Mains et merveilles). Editions La Difference, Paris, 1997 
 Messer, Thomas M., Renard, Claude-Louis, Soto, Jesús. Soto: A Retrospective Exhibition, catalogue published to coincide with the exhibition. Accompanying text in English, French and Spanish, Published by: The Solomon R Guggenheim Museum, New York, 1974.

See also 
 National Prize of Plastic Arts of Venezuela

References

External links

 Artist's official Website

1923 births
2005 deaths
People from Ciudad Bolívar
20th-century Venezuelan sculptors
20th-century Venezuelan male artists
Male sculptors
Burials at Montparnasse Cemetery
Venezuelan contemporary artists